The Biographisch-Bibliographisches Kirchenlexikon (BBKL) is a German biographical encyclopedia covering persons related to the history of the church, philosophy and literature, founded 1975 by Friedrich Wilhelm Bautz.

It features about 20,000 articles, many of which used to be freely available online.  At present access is pay-only.

Literature 

 Friedrich Wilhelm Bautz (from Volume 3 (Vol. 3) onwards continued by Traugott Bautz): Biographisch-bibliographisches Kirchenlexikon, 14 Bände (+ bisher 14 Ergänzungsbände), Bautz, Hamm 1975ff
 Volume 1 (Aalders–Faustus v. Byzanz), Hamm 1975, 
 Volume 2 (Faustus v. Mileve–Jeanne, d'Arc), Hamm 1990, 
 Volume 3 (Jedin–Kleinschmidt), Herzberg 1992, 
 Volume 4 (Kleist–Leyden), Herzberg 1992, 
 Volume 5 (Leyen–Mönch), Herzberg 1993, 
 Volume 6 (Moenius–Patijn), Herzberg 1993, 
 Volume 7 (Patocka–Remachus), Herzberg 1994, 
 Volume 8 (Rembrandt–Scharbel (Charbel)), Herzberg 1994, 
 Volume 9 (Scharling–Sheldon), Herzberg 1995, 
 Volume 10 (Shelkov–Stoß, Andreas), Herzberg 1995, 
 Volume 11 (Stoß, Veit–Tieffenthaler), Herzberg 1996, 
 Volume 12 (Tibbon–Volpe), Herzberg 1997, 
 Volume 13 (Voltaire–Wolfram von Eschenbach), Herzberg 1998, 
 Volume 14 (Abachum–Zygomalas), Herzberg 1998, 

Supplements:
 Volume 15, Herzberg 1999, 
 Volume 16, Herzberg 1999, 
 Volume 17, Herzberg 2000, 
 Volume 18, Herzberg 2001, 
 Volume 19, Nordhausen 2001, 
 Volume 20, Nordhausen 2002, 
 Volume 21, Nordhausen 2003, 
 Volume 22, Nordhausen 2003, 
 Volume 23, Nordhausen 2004, 
 Volume 24, Nordhausen 2005, 
 Volume 25, Nordhausen 2005, 
 Volume 26, Nordhausen 2006, 
 Volume 27, Nordhausen 2007, 
 Volume 28, Nordhausen 2007, 
 Volume 29, Nordhausen 2008, 
 Volume 30, Nordhausen 2009, 
 Volume 31, Nordhausen 2010, 
 Volume 32, Nordhausen 2011, 
 Volume 33, Nordhausen 2012, 
 Volume 34, Nordhausen 2013, 
 Volume 35, Nordhausen 2014, 
 Volume 36, Nordhausen 2015, 
 Volume 37, Nordhausen 2016, 
 Volume 38, Nordhausen 2017, 
 Volume 39, Nordhausen 2018,

External links 
 Internet BBKL.de

German biographical dictionaries
Historiography of Christianity